Juneau International Airport  is a city-owned, public-use airport and seaplane base located seven nautical miles (8 mi, 13 km) northwest of the central business district of Juneau, a city and borough in the U.S. state of Alaska that has no direct road access to the outside world.  The airport serves as a regional hub for all air travel, from bush carriers to  major U.S. air carriers such as Alaska Airlines.

The National Plan of Integrated Airport Systems for 2015-2019 categorized it as a primary commercial service (nonhub) airport based on 353,048 enplanements (boardings) in 2012. As per the Federal Aviation Administration, this airport had 378,741 passenger enplanements in calendar year 2008, 337,038 in 2009, and 344,057 in 2010.

History
During World War II, Juneau Airport was used by the United States Army Air Forces as a transport link between the combat bases being established in the Aleutians and airfields in the mainland United States. It was also used by Air Transport Command and facilitated the transport of Lend-Lease aircraft to the Soviet Union via Nome (Marks Army Airfield).

Historical airline service
Pan American World Airways (Pan Am) was one of the first major airlines to serve Juneau. In 1947, Pan Am was operating daily Douglas DC-4 propliner service to Seattle via a stop at the Annette Island Airport, which served Ketchikan at the time and also flew DC-4 service twice a week nonstop to Whitehorse in the Yukon Territory of Canada with continuing, no change of plane service to Fairbanks, Galena and Nome in Alaska.  Pan Am later operated Douglas DC-6B and Boeing 377 Stratocruiser aircraft into the airport.  During the 1950s, Pacific Northern Airlines served the airport with Douglas DC-4 and Lockheed Constellation propliners with daily service to Seattle via a stop at Annette Island as well as nonstop to Anchorage and Yakutat and direct to Cordova in Alaska.

The jet age arrived in Juneau during the early 1960s.  In 1963, Pan Am was operating daily Boeing 707 jetliner flights to Seattle via a stop at Annette Island.  By 1965, Pacific Northern was operating Boeing 720 jets nonstop to Seattle, Anchorage and Annette Island. In 1967, Pacific Northern was acquired by and merged into Western Airlines, which continued to operate jet service into the airport.  By 1968, Western was operating daily nonstop Boeing 720B jet service to Seattle, Anchorage and Annette Island with one stop direct service to Los Angeles.  By 1969, Alaska Airlines was operating Boeing 727-100 jet service into the airport on a daily basis with a round trip routing of Seattle - Sitka - Juneau - Yakutat - Cordova - Anchorage - Unalakleet - Nome - Kotzebue.  Alaska Air has served Juneau for over 45 years and primarily operated Boeing 727-100, 727-200 and 737-200 jetliners into the airport (including the Boeing 737-200 passenger/freight Combi aircraft) in addition to Boeing 720 jetliners before switching to later model Boeing 737 jets.  Besides operating jet service into Juneau, Alaska Airlines also flew smaller prop and turboprop aircraft from the airport in the past including the Convair 240, de Havilland Canada DHC-6 Twin Otter and two versions of the Grumman Goose amphibian aircraft, being a piston powered model and a turboprop version with the latter being named the "Turbo-Goose" by the airline.  Alaska Airlines began serving Juneau during the late 1960s following its acquisition of two local air service carriers, Alaska Coastal Airlines, which was based in Juneau, and Cordova Airlines.

Other air carriers that served Juneau over the years included Wien Air Alaska and MarkAir, which had both been based in Alaska.  Western Airlines also returned to Juneau after ceasing service during the early 1970s.  In 1968, Wien was operating Fairchild F-27 turboprop flights into the airport three days a week on a routing of Juneau - Whitehorse - Fairbanks.  By 1977, Wien was flying Boeing 737-200 jet service twice a week from the airport on a routing of Juneau - Whitehorse - Fairbanks - Anchorage and by 1979 the airline was operating daily nonstop 737-200 jet flights to Seattle and Anchorage.  During the early and mid 1980s, Western was operating daily nonstop Boeing 727-200 service to Seattle. Following its acquisition of and merger with Western in 1987, Delta Air Lines continued to serve Juneau with daily nonstop Boeing 727-200 flights to Seattle and direct, one stop service to Los Angeles into the early 1990s.  In 1995, MarkAir operated daily nonstop Boeing 737-400 jet service to Seattle and Anchorage.  In 2014, Delta Air Lines returned to Juneau offering first seasonal, and then year round service before leaving the market again at the end of 2016 and now serves Juneau on a seasonal basis.  Delta entering the market to compete with Alaska Air resulted in fares to Seattle being reduced almost by half.

Facilities and aircraft

Juneau International Airport covers an area of 662 acres (268 ha) at an elevation of 25 feet (8 m) above mean sea level. It has one runway designated 8/26 with an asphalt surface measuring 8,857 by 150 feet (2,700 x 46 m). It also has one seaplane landing area designated 8W/26W, which measures 4,600 by 150 feet (1,402 x 46 m).

For the 12-month period ending December 31, 2017, the airport had 108,885 aircraft operations, an average of 298 per day: 79% air taxi, 12% general aviation, 8% scheduled commercial, and <1% military. At that time 275 aircraft were based at this airport: 87% single-engine, 1% multi-engine, <1% jet, 10% helicopter, and 1% military.

Airlines and destinations
Aside from providing passenger service, Alaska Airlines also operates Boeing 737-700 jet freighter cargo flight service into Juneau.

Passenger

Cargo

Statistics

Statistics

Top destinations

Accidents and incidents
 On September 4, 1971, Alaska Airlines Flight 1866, a Boeing 727-100, crashed into the easterly slope of a canyon in the Chilkat Range of the Tongass National Forest while on approach to Juneau International Airport. All 111 passengers and crew on board were killed. At the time, it was the worst single airplane air disaster in United States history.

See also
 Alaska World War II Army Airfields
 List of airports in Alaska

References

External links

 Juneau International Airport, official website
 FAA Alaska airport diagram for Juneau International (JNU) (GIF)
 Topographic map from USGS The National Map
 
 

 

Airfields of the United States Army Air Forces in Alaska
Airports in Alaska
Transportation buildings and structures in Juneau, Alaska
WAAS reference stations